Brandon Cole (born March 13, 1984) is an American professional basketball player who played college basketball for Xavier.

References

External links
Xavier Musketeers bio

1984 births
Living people
American expatriate basketball people in North Macedonia
American men's basketball players
Miyazaki Shining Suns players
Place of birth missing (living people)
Power forwards (basketball)
Toyama Grouses players
Xavier Musketeers men's basketball players
Xinjiang Flying Tigers players